Boarding in ice hockey and ringette is a penalty called when an offending player pushes, trips or checks an opposing player violently into the boards (walls) of the hockey rink. This article deals chiefly with ice hockey.

In ice hockey, the boarding call is quite often a major penalty due to the likelihood of injury sustained by the player who was boarded, and officials have the discretion to call a game misconduct or a match penalty (if they feel the offense was a deliberate attempt to injure) on the offending player. However, in the North American professional ice hockey league, the NHL, if a major penalty is assessed and the boarded player sustains a head or facial injury, the offending player receives an automatic game misconduct. If no injury is sustained, then a minor penalty will be called. In college ice hockey, the player does not need to be injured for it to be a major penalty. Boarding is usually assessed against a player when the opposing player is hit 4–5 feet away from the boards and hits one's head against the boards on the way down.

See also
Checking (ice hockey)

Sources
NHL Rulebook entry on boarding

Ice hockey penalties
Violence in ice hockey
Ice hockey terminology